Amy Lang (born 13 August 1991) is an Australian female acrobatic gymnast. With partners Elizabeth Jacobs and Elodie Rousseau Forwood, Lang achieved 6th in the 2014 Acrobatic Gymnastics World Championships.

References

1991 births
Living people
Australian acrobatic gymnasts
Female acrobatic gymnasts
Place of birth missing (living people)